A keep is fortified tower in a castle. 

Keep, KEEP, or The Keep may also refer to:

Literature
 The Keep, a fictional location on Arrakis in the 1965 Dune series
 The Keep (Wilson novel), a 1981 novel by F. Paul Wilson
 The Keep (comics), a 2006 limited series based on the Wilson novel
 The Keep (Egan novel), a 2006 novel by Jennifer Egan

Music
The Keep (Happy Rhodes album) (1995)
The Keep (Tangerine Dream album), a 1997 soundtrack album

Places 
 The Keep, Brighton, opened 2013, an archive and historical resource centre in East Sussex, England
 The Keep, Dorchester, (c. 1880), a museum and former barracks in Dorset, England

Software 
 Google Keep, a 2013 note-taking software program
 Keep (app), a 2015 Chinese mobile fitness app

Other uses
Keep (surname), including a list of people with the name
KEEP, a radio station in Texas, U.S.
The Keep (film), a 1983 horror film based on the Wilson novel
The Keep (Mayfair Games), a role-playing-game scenario based on the film
The Keep (video game), a 2014 Nintendo 3DS game
Keep Cottage, a building in Oberlin, Ohio, U.S.
Keeping Emulation Environments Portable, a European project to preserve access to obsolete file formats

See also 
Keep case, form of packaging for CDs or DVDs
Keeper (disambiguation)
Keepers (disambiguation)
Keeping